This is a list of butterflies of Ghana. About 860 species are known from Ghana, but only 23 are endemic.

Nymphalidae

Apaturinae
Apaturopsis cleochares

Biblidinae
Ariadne albifascia
Ariadne enotrea
Byblia anvatara
Byblia ilithyia
Eurytela dryope
Eurytela hiarbas
Mesoxanthia ethosea
Nepidopsis ophione
Sevenia boisduvali
Sevenia occidentalium
Sevenia umbrina

Charaxinae
Charaxes achaemenes
Charaxes ameliae
Charaxes anticlea
Charaxes bipunctatus
Charaxes bocqueti
Charaxes boueti
Charaxes brutus
Charaxes candiope
Charaxes castor
Charaxes cedreatis
Charaxes cynthia
Charaxes doubledayi
Charaxes epijasius
Charaxes etesipe
Charaxes etheocles
Charaxes eudoxus
Charaxes eupale
Charaxes fournierae
Charaxes fulvescens
Charaxes hadrianus
Charaxes hildebrandti
Charaxes imperialis
Charaxes lactetinctus
Charaxes lucretius
Charaxes lycurgus
Charaxes mycerina
Charaxes nichetes
Charaxes nobilis
Charaxes northcotti
Charaxes numenes
Charaxes paphianus
Charaxes petersi
Charaxes plantroui
Charaxes pleione
Charaxes pollux
Charaxes porthos
Charaxes protoclea
Charaxes pythodoris
Charaxes smaragdalis
Charaxes subornatus
Charaxes tiridates
Charaxes varanes
Charaxes viola
Charaxes virilis
Charaxes zelica
Charaxes zingha
Euxanthe eurinome
Palla decius
Palla publius
Palla ussheri
Palla violinitens

Cyrestinae
Cyrestis camillus

Danainae
Amauris damocles
Amauris hecate
Amauris niavius
Amauris tartarea
Danaus chrysippus
Tirumala petiverana

Libytheinae
Libythea labdaca

Limenitidinae
Harma theobene
Cymothoe fumana
Cymothoe egesta
Cymothoe lurida
Cymothoe aubergeri
Cymothoe herminia
Cymothoe weymeri
Cymothoe caenis
Cymothoe althea
Cymothoe jodutta
Cymothoe coccinata
Cymothoe mabillei
Cymothoe sangaris
Pseudoneptis bugandensis
Pseudacraea eurytus
Pseudacraea boisduvalii
Pseudacraea lucretia
Pseudacraea warburgi
Pseudacraea hostilia
Pseudacraea semire
Neptis nemetes
Neptis metella
Neptis serena
Neptis kiriakoffi
Neptis morosa
Neptis loma
Neptis angusta
Neptis alta
Neptis seeldrayersi
Neptis puella
Neptis conspicua
Neptis najo
Neptis metanira
Neptis continuata
Neptis nysiades
Neptis nicomedes
Neptis quintilla
Neptis paula
Neptis strigata
Neptis nicoteles
Neptis nicobule
Neptis mixophyes
Neptis nebrodes
Neptis trigonophora
Neptis agouale
Neptis melicerta
Neptis troundi
Catuna crithea
Catuna niji
Catuna oberthueri
Catuna angustatum
Euryphura togoensis
Euryphura chalcis
Hamanumida daedalus
Aterica galene
Cynandra opis
Euriphene incerta
Euriphene barombina
Euriphene veronica
Euriphene grosesmithi
Euriphene simplex
Euriphene amicia
Euriphene aridatha
Euriphene coerulea
Euriphene ernestibaumanni
Euriphene gambiae
Euriphene ampedusa
Euriphene leonis
Euriphene atossa
Euriphene doriclea
Bebearia lucayensis
Bebearia tentyris
Bebearia osyris
Bebearia carshena
Bebearia absolon
Bebearia zonara
Bebearia mandinga
Bebearia oxione
Bebearia abesa
Bebearia barce
Bebearia mardania
Bebearia cocalia
Bebearia paludicola
Bebearia sophus
Bebearia arcadius
Bebearia laetitia
Bebearia phantasina
Bebearia demetra
Bebearia maledicta
Bebearia ashantina
Bebearia cutteri
Medoniana medon
Euphaedra gausape
Euphaedra mariaechristinae
Euphaedra xypete
Euphaedra hebes
Euphaedra diffusa
Euphaedra crossei
Euphaedra crockeri
Euphaedra eusemoides
Euphaedra cyparissa
Euphaedra sarcoptera
Euphaedra themis
Euphaedra laboureana
Euphaedra minuta
Euphaedra modesta
Euphaedra janetta
Euphaedra splendens
Euphaedra aberrans
Euphaedra vetusta
Euphaedra ceres
Euphaedra phaethusa
Euphaedra inanum
Euphaedra ignota
Euphaedra francina
Euphaedra eleus
Euphaedra zampa
Euphaedra edwardsii
Euphaedra ruspina
Euphaedra perseis
Euphaedra harpalyce
Euphaedra eupalus
Euptera crowleyi
Euptera elabontas
Euptera dorothea
Euptera zowa
Pseudathyma falcata
Pseudathyma sibyllina

Heliconiinae
Acraea abdera
Acraea acerata
Acraea alcinoe
Acraea alciope
Acraea aurivillii
Acraea bonasia
Acraea caecilia
Acraea camaena
Acraea circeis
Acraea consanguinea
Acraea egina
Acraea encedana
Acraea encedon
Acraea endoscota
Acraea epaea
Acraea eugenia
Acraea jodutta
Acraea kraka
Acraea leucographa
Acraea lycoa
Acraea macaria
Acraea neobule
Acraea orestia
Acraea orina
Acraea parrhasia
Acraea peneleos
Acraea perenna
Acraea pharsalus
Acraea polis
Acraea pseudegina
Acraea pseudepaea
Acraea quirina
Acraea rogersi
Acraea serena
Acraea translucida
Acraea umbra
Acraea vesperalis
Acraea vestalis
Acraea zetes
Lachnoptera anticlia
Phalanta eurytis
Phalanta phalantha

Nymphalinae
Antanartia delius
Catacroptera cloanthe
Hypolimnas anthedon
Hypolimnas dinarcha
Hypolimnas misippus
Hypolimnas salmacis
Junonia chorimene
Junonia cymodoce
Junonia hadrope
Junonia hierta
Junonia oenone
Junonia orithya
Junonia sophia
Junonia stygia
Junonia terea
Junonia westermanni
Kallimodes rumia
Precis antilope
Precis ceryne
Precis octavia
Precis pelarga
Precis sinuata
Protogoniomorpha anacardii
Protogoniomorpha cytora
Protogoniomorpha parhassus
Salamis cacta
Vanessa cardui
Vanessula milca

Satyrinae
Gnophodes betsimena
Gnophodes chelys
Melanitis leda
Melanitis libya
Elymniopsis bammakoo
Bicyclus xeneas
Bicyclus evadne
Bicyclus ephorus
Bicyclus italus
Bicyclus zinebi
Bicyclus uniformis
Bicyclus procora
Bicyclus pavonis
Bicyclus milyas
Bicyclus trilophus
Bicyclus ignobilis
Bicyclus maesseni
Bicyclus nobilis
Bicyclus taenias
Bicyclus vulgaris
Bicyclus dorothea
Bicyclus sandace
Bicyclus sambulos
Bicyclus sangmelinae
Bicyclus mandanes
Bicyclus auricruda
Bicyclus campa
Bicyclus angulosa
Bicyclus sylvicolus
Bicyclus abnormis
Bicyclus safitza
Bicyclus funebris
Bicyclus dekeyseri
Bicyclus istaris
Bicyclus madetes
Bicyclus martius
Hallelesis halyma
Henotesia elisi
Heteropsis peitho
Ypthima asterope
Ypthima condamini
Ypthima antennata
Ypthima vuattouxi
Ypthima doleta
Ypthima pupillaris
Ypthima impura
Ypthimomorpha itonia

Hesperiidae

Coeliadinae
Coeliades bixana
Coeliades chalybe
Coeliades forestan
Coeliades hanno
Coeliades libeon
Coeliades pisistratus
Pyrrhiades lucagus
Pyrrhochalcia iphis

Hesperiinae
Acleros bala
Acleros mackenii
Acleros nigrapex
Acleros ploetzi
Andronymus caesar
Andronymus evander
Andronymus helles
Andronymus hero
Andronymus neander
Artitropa comus
Astictopterus abjecta
Astictopterus anomoeus
Borbo binga
Borbo borbonica
Borbo fallax
Borbo fanta
Borbo fatuellus
Borbo gemella
Borbo holtzi
Borbo micans
Borbo perobscura
Caenides benga
Caenides dacela
Caenides dacena
Caenides dacenilla
Caenides hidarioides
Caenides kangvensis
Caenides otilia
Caenides soritia
Caenides xychus
Ceratrichia argyrosticta
Ceratrichia clara
Ceratrichia crowleyi
Ceratrichia maesseni
Ceratrichia nothus
Ceratrichia phocion
Ceratrichia semilutea
Fresna carlo
Fresna cojo
Fresna maesseni
Fresna netopha
Fresna nyassae
Gamia buchholzi
Gamia shelleyi
Gegenes hottentota 
Gegenes niso
Gegenes pumilio
Gorgyra aburae
Gorgyra afikpo
Gorgyra aretina
Gorgyra bina
Gorgyra bule
Gorgyra diversata
Gorgyra heterochrus
Gorgyra minima
Gorgyra mocquerysii
Gorgyra pali
Gorgyra sara
Gorgyra sola
Gorgyra subfacatus
Gretna balenge
Gretna cylinda
Gretna waga
Gyrogra subnotata
Hypoleucis ophiusa
Hypoleucis sophia
Hypoleucis tripunctata
Kedestes protensa
Leona binoevatus
Leona halma
Leona leonora
Leona lota
Leona luehderi
Leona meloui
Leona stoehri
Melphina flavina
Melphina malthina
Melphina maximiliani
Melphina noctula
Melphina statira
Melphina statirides
Melphina tarace
Melphina unistriga
Meza cybeutes
Meza elba
Meza indusiata
Meza leucophaea
Meza mabea
Meza mabillei
Meza meza
Monza alberti
Monza cretacea
Mopala orma
Osmodes adon
Osmodes adosus
Osmodes banghaasi
Osmodes costatus
Osmodes distincta
Osmodes laronia
Osmodes lindseyi
Osmodes lux
Osmodes omar
Osmodes thora
Osphantes ogowena
Paracleros biguttulus
Paracleros maesseni
Paracleros placidus
Paracleros substrigata
Pardaleodes edipus
Pardaleodes incerta
Pardaleodes sator
Pardaleodes tibullus
Pardaleodes xanthopeplus
Parnara monasi
Paronymus ligora
Paronymus nevea
Paronymus xanthias
Parosmodes lentiginosa
Parosmodes morantii
Pelopidas mathias
Pelopidas thrax
Platylesches affinissima
Platylesches batangae
Platylesches chamaeleon
Platylesches galesa
Platylesches lamba
Platylesches moritili
Platylesches picanini
Platylesches rossi
Prosopalpus debilis
Prosopalpus saga
Prosopalpus styla
Pteroteinon caenira
Pteroteinon capronnieri
Pteroteinon ceucaenira
Pteroteinon concaenira
Pteroteinon iricolor
Pteroteinon laterculus
Pteroteinon laufella
Pteroteinon pruna
Rhabdomantis galatia
Rhabdomantis sosia
Semalea arela
Semalea atrio
Semalea pulvina
Semalea sextilis
Teniorhinus ignita
Teniorhinus watsoni
Xanthodisca astrape
Xanthodisca rega
Zophopetes cerymica
Zophopetes ganda
Zophopetes quaternata

Pyrginae
Abantis bismarcki
Abantis elegantula
Abantis ja
Abantis leucogaster
Abantis lucretia
Abantis nigeriana
Abantis pseudonigeriana
Abantis tanobia
Calleagris lacteus
Caprona adelica
Caprona pillaana
Celaenorrhinus ankasa
Celaenorrhinus cf galenus
Celaenorrhinus galenus
Celaenorrhinus leona
Celaenorrhinus meditrina
Celaenorrhinus ovalis
Celaenorrhinus plagiatus
Celaenorrhinus proxima
Celaenorrhinus rutilans
Celaenorrhinus sagamase
Eagris decastigma
Eagris denuba
Eagris hereus
Eagris subalbida
Eagris tetrastigma
Eagris tigris
Eretis lugens
Eretis melania
Eretis plistonicus
Gomalia elma
Katreus johnstonii
Loxolexis dimidia
Loxolexis hollandi
Loxolexis holocausta
Netrobalane canopus
Procampta rara
Sarangesa bouvieri
Sarangesa brigida
Sarangesa laelius
Sarangesa majorella
Sarangesa phidyle
Sarangesa tertullianus
Sarangesa thecla
Sarangesa tricerata
Spialia diomus
Spialia dromus
Spialia ploetzi
Spialia spio
Tagiades flesus

Lycaenidae

Poritiinae
Aethiopana honorius
Argyrocheila undifera
Cephetola cephena
Cephetola collinsi
Cephetola maesseni
Cephetola mercedes
Cephetola obscura
Cephetola pinodes
Cephetola subcoerulea
Cephetola sublustris
Cerautola ceraunia
Cerautola crowleyi
Citrinophila erastus
Citrinophila marginalis
Citrinophila similis
Epitola posthumus
Epitola urania
Epitola uranoides
Epitolina catori
Epitolina dispar
Epitolina melissa
Eresina maesseni
Eresina pseudofusca
Eresina saundersi
Eresina theodori
Eresiomera bicolor
Eresiomera isca
Eresiomera jacksoni
Eresiomera petersi
Falcuna campimus
Falcuna leonensis
Geritola gerina
Geritola virginea
Hewitsonia boisduvalii
Hewitsonia inexpectata
Hewitsonia occidentalis
Hypophytala benitensis
Hypophytala henleyi
Hypophytala hyettina
Hypophytala hyettoides
Iridana exquisita
Iridana ghanana
Iridana hypocala
Iridana incredibilis
Iridana nigeriana
Kakumia otlauga
Larinopoda aspidos
Larinopoda eurema
Liptena albicans
Liptena alluaudi
Liptena catalina
Liptena evanescens
Liptena fatima
Liptena ferrymani
Liptena flavicans
Liptena griveaudi
Liptena helena
Liptena pearmani
Liptena rochei
Liptena septistrigata
Liptena seyboui
Liptena similis
Liptena simplicia
Liptena submacula
Liptena tiassale
Liptena xanthostola
Micropentila adelgitha
Micropentila adelgunda
Micropentila brunnea
Micropentila dorothea
Micropentila mamfe
Mimacraea darwinia
Mimacraea maesseni
Mimacraea neurata
Mimeresia cellularis
Mimeresia debora
Mimeresia issia
Mimeresia libentina
Mimeresia moyambina
Mimeresia semirufa
Naeveia lamborni
Ornipholidotos irwini
Ornipholidotos issia
Ornipholidotos nigeriae
Ornipholidotos nympha
Ornipholidotos onitshae
Ornipholidotos tiassale
Pentila hewitsonii
Pentila pauli
Pentila petreia
Pentila petreoides
Pentila phidia
Pentila picena
Phytala elais
Pseuderesia eleaza
Ptelina carnuta
Stempfferia cercene
Stempfferia ciconia
Stempfferia dorothea
Stempfferia kholifa
Stempfferia leonina
Stempfferia michelae
Stempfferia moyambina
Stempfferia staudingeri
Stempfferia zelza
Telipna acraea
Telipna maesseni
Telipna semirufa
Tetrarhanis baralingam
Tetrarhanis stempfferi
Tetrarhanis symplocus
Torbenia wojtusiaki

Miletinae
Aslauga ernesti
Aslauga imitans
Aslauga lamborni
Aslauga marginalis
Euliphyra hewitsoni
Euliphyra leucyania
Euliphyra mirifica
Lachnocnema albimacula
Lachnocnema disrupta
Lachnocnema emperanus
Lachnocnema luna
Lachnocnema reutlingeri
Lachnocnema vuattouxi
Megalopalpus metaleucus
Megalopalpus zymna
Spalgis lemolea

Polyommatinae
Actizera lucida
Anthene amarah
Anthene atewa
Anthene crawshayi
Anthene definita
Anthene helpsi
Anthene irumu
Anthene juba
Anthene kikuyu
Anthene lachares
Anthene larydas
Anthene levis
Anthene ligures
Anthene liodes
Anthene locuples
Anthene lunulata
Anthene lysicles
Anthene princeps
Anthene radiata
Anthene rubricinctus
Anthene scintillula
Anthene starki
Anthene sylvanus
Anthene talboti
Anthene wilsoni
Azanus isis
Azanus jesous
Azanus mirza
Azanus moriqua
Azanus natalensis
Azanus ubaldus
Cacyreus audeoudi
Cacyreus lingeus
Chilades eleusis
Cupidesthes jacksoni
Cupidesthes leonina
Cupidesthes lithas
Cupidesthes mimetica
Cupidesthes pungusei
Cupidopsis cissus
Cupidopsis jobates
Eicochrysops dudgeoni
Eicochrysops hippocrates
Euchrysops albistriata
Euchrysops barkeri
Euchrysops malathana
Euchrysops osiris
Euchrysops reducta
Euchrysops sahelianus
Freyeria trochylus
Lampides boeticus
Lepidochrysops parsimon
Lepidochrysops quassi
Lepidochrysops synchrematiza
Lepidochrysops victoriae
Leptotes babaulti
Leptotes brevidentatus
Leptotes jeanneli
Leptotes pirithous
Leptotes pulchra
Lyzanius lyzanius
Neurellipes chryseostictus
Neurellipes fulvus
Neurellipes gemmifera
Neurellipes lusones
Neurellipes staudingeri
Oboronia guessfeldti
Oboronia liberiana
Oboronia ornata
Oboronia pseudopunctatus
Oboronia punctatus
Phlyaria cyara
Pseudonacaduba sichela
Tarucus rosacea
Tarucus ungemachi
Thermoniphas micylus
Triclema fasciatus
Triclema hades
Triclema inconspicua
Triclema lamias
Triclema lucretilis
Triclema nigeriae
Triclema obscura
Triclema phoenicis
Triclema rufoplagata
Tuxentius carana
Tuxentius cretosus
Uranothauma falkensteini
Zizeeria knysna
Zizina antanossa
Zizula hylax

Theclinae
Capys vorgasi
Dapidodigma demeter
Dapidodigma hymen
Deudorix antalus
Deudorix caliginosa
Deudorix dinochares
Deudorix dinomenes
Deudorix galathea
Deudorix kayonza
Deudorix livia
Deudorix lorisona
Deudorix odana
Etesiolaus catori
Etesiolaus kyabobo
Hypolycaena antifaunus
Hypolycaena clenchi
Hypolycaena dubia
Hypolycaena hatita
Hypolycaena kadiskos
Hypolycaena kakumi
Hypolycaena lebona
Hypolycaena liara
Hypolycaena nigra
Hypolycaena philippus
Hypolycaena scintillans
Hypomyrina mimetica
Hypomyrina nomion
Iolaus aethria
Iolaus alcibiades
Iolaus alienus
Iolaus banco
Iolaus bellina
Iolaus calisto
Iolaus carolinae
Iolaus eurisus
Iolaus farquharsoni
Iolaus fontainei
Iolaus iasis
Iolaus ismenias
Iolaus iulus
Iolaus laon
Iolaus laonides
Iolaus likpe
Iolaus lukabas
Iolaus maesa
Iolaus mane
Iolaus menas
Iolaus paneperata
Iolaus parasilanus
Iolaus sappirus
Iolaus scintillans
Iolaus theodori
Iolaus timon
Myrina silenus
Myrina subornata
Oxylides faunus
Paradeudorix eleala
Paradeudorix moyambina
Pilodeudorix aucta
Pilodeudorix aurivilliusi
Pilodeudorix caerulea
Pilodeudorix camerona
Pilodeudorix catori
Pilodeudorix corruscans
Pilodeudorix deritas
Pilodeudorix diyllus
Pilodeudorix fumata
Pilodeudorix kiellandi
Pilodeudorix laticlavia
Pilodeudorix leonina
Pilodeudorix otraeda
Pilodeudorix pseudoderitas
Pilodeudorix violetta
Pilodeudorix virgata
Pilodeudorix zela
Stugeta marmoreus
Zeritis neriene

Aphnaeinae
Aphnaeus argyrocyclus
Aphnaeus asterius
Aphnaeus brahami
Aphnaeus charboneli
Aphnaeus gilloni
Aphnaeus jefferyi
Aphnaeus orcas
Axiocerses amanga
Axiocerses harpax
Cigaritis avriko
Cigaritis crustaria
Cigaritis iza
Cigaritis menelas
Cigaritis mozambica
Cigaritis nilus
Lipaphnaeus aderna
Lipaphnaeus leonina
Pseudaletis agrippina
Pseudaletis dardanella
Pseudaletis leonis
Pseudaletis subangulata

Pieridae

Coliadinae
Catopsilia florella
Eurema brigitta
Eurema desjardinsii
Eurema floricola
Eurema hapale
Eurema hecabe
Eurema senegalensis

Pierinae
Appias epaphia
Appias phaola
Appias sabina
Appias sylvia
Belenois aurota
Belenois calypso
Belenois creona
Belenois gidica
Belenois hedyle
Belenois subeida
Belenois theora
Colotis antevippe
Colotis aurora
Colotis celimene
Colotis danae
Colotis euippe
Colotis evagore
Colotis ione
Colotis vesta
Dixeia capricornus
Dixeia cebron
Dixeia doxo
Dixeia orbona
Leptosia alcesta
Leptosia hybrida
Leptosia marginea
Leptosia medusa
Leptosia wigginsi
Mylothris aburi
Mylothris atewa
Mylothris chloris
Mylothris dimidiata
Mylothris jaopura
Mylothris poppea
Mylothris rhodope
Mylothris schumanni
Mylothris spica
Nepheronia argia
Nepheronia pharis
Nepheronia thalassina
Pinacopteryx eriphia

Pseudopontiinae
Pseudopontia paradoxa

Riodinidae
Abisara gerontes
Abisara intermedia
Abisara tantalus

Papilionidae

Papilioninae
Graphium adamastor
Graphium agamedes
Graphium almansor
Graphium angolanus
Graphium antheus
Graphium illyris
Graphium latreillianus
Graphium leonidas
Graphium liponesco
Graphium policenes
Graphium rileyi
Graphium tynderaeus
Papilio antimachus
Papilio chrapkowskoides
Papilio cynorta
Papilio cyproeofila
Papilio dardanus
Papilio demodocus
Papilio horribilis
Papilio menestheus
Papilio nireus
Papilio nobicea
Papilio phorcas
Papilio sosia
Papilio zalmoxis
Papilio zenobia

See also
Ghana in List of terrestrial ecoregions (WWF)
Geography of Ghana

References

External links 
 Butterflies of Ghana
 The Butterflies Of Ghana And Their Implications For Conservation And Sustainable Use
 Seitz, A. Die Gross-Schmetterlinge der Erde 13: Die Afrikanischen Tagfalter. Plates 
 Seitz, A. Die Gross-Schmetterlinge der Erde 13: Die Afrikanischen Tagfalter. Text (in German)

Ghana
Ghana
Ghana
Ghana
Butterflies